Pico Mountain is a summit located in Central New York Region of New York located in the Town of Ohio in Herkimer County, northeast of Atwell. Burnt Mountain is located north of Pico Mountain.

References

Mountains of Herkimer County, New York
Mountains of New York (state)